Tor-Arne Strøm (born 6 May 1952, in Rana) is a Norwegian politician for the Labour Party.

He was elected to the Norwegian Parliament from Nordland in 2001, and has been re-elected on two occasions.

Strøm held various positions in Rana municipality council from 1987 to 1991 and 1995 to 2001, serving as deputy mayor in 1999–2001. From 1991 to 1999 he was deputy member of Nordland county council.

Outside politics he has been a factory worker and a trade unionist.

References

1952 births
Living people
Members of the Storting
Nordland politicians
Labour Party (Norway) politicians
Norwegian trade unionists
21st-century Norwegian politicians
People from Rana, Norway